Louisville is an unincorporated community in Chariton County, in the U.S. state of Missouri.

The community was named after Louisville, Kentucky, the native home of an early settler.

References

Unincorporated communities in Chariton County, Missouri
Unincorporated communities in Missouri